Sheila Ramani (2 March 1932 – 15 July 2015), also known as Sheila Kewalramani, was an Indian actress who was introduced into Bollywood by the film-maker Chetan Anand. She is known for her role in the movie Taxi Driver. She was born in Sindh and was one of the few actresses from Sindh to join the Indian film industry.

Personal life
Ramani was crowned Miss Shimla in the early 1950s. She was mostly seen as an upper-class mod girl in the roles she portrayed in many movies. She played the lead in a Pakistani film. Ramani went back to India and starred in further movies in Mumbai. In the later part of her career, she was reduced to obscure films.

Later on in her life Ramani married and moved to the United States. She lived her last years in Mhow, a small cantonment town in the Indore district of Madhya Pradesh. She died on 15 July 2015. Ramani's husband Jall Cowasji, a noted industrialist, died about three decades ago. She was survived by her two sons Rahul and Zal.

Filmography
 Anand Math (1952)
 Surang (1953)
 Taxi Driver (1954)
 Teen Batti Char Raasta (1953)
 Naukri (1954)
 Mangu (1954)
 Meenar (1954)
 Railway Platform (1955)
 Funtoosh (1956)
 Anokhi (1956)
 Abana - Sindhi (1958)
 Jungle King (1959)
 The Return of Mr. Superman (1960)
 Awara ladki  (1967)

References

External links
 

1932 births
2015 deaths
Indian film actresses
Indian expatriates in the United States
Indian expatriate actresses in Pakistan
Sindhi people
Actresses in Hindi cinema
20th-century Indian actresses